Dirk de Vos is a Belgian art historian specialising in medieval art. He was the curator of the Groeningemuseum in Bruges.

Education
De Vos attended secondary school in Bruges, graduating in 1961.

Work
De Vos's magnum opus is a catalogue of the complete works of Hans Memling, on whom he curated a major exhibition in 1994. He followed this in 1999 with a catalogue of the complete works of Rogier van der Weyden.

Publications

Stedelijke musea Brugge: catalogus schilderijen 15de en 16de eeuw. Stad Brugge, 1979.
Groeningemuseum Brugge: de volledige verzameling. Die Keure, 1984.
Catalogue: Hans Memling. Fonds Mercator Paribas, 1994 
(editor), Essays: Hans Memling. Stedelijke Musea, Bruges, 1994 
Hans Memling: The Complete Works. Thames & Hudson, 1994. 
Rogier van der Weyden: The Complete Works, translated by Ted Alkins. Harry N. Abrams, 1999. 
The Flemish Primitives: The Masterpieces . Mercatorfonds and Princeton University Press, 2003.

References

Belgian art historians
Year of birth missing (living people)
Living people